Frederick was an American-built ship that the British captured from the French c.1805. Lumley & Co. purchased her in prize and employed her as a slave-ship for two voyages. After the abolition of the British slave trade in 1807 she briefly became a merchantman, and then in 1810 a whaler. She made several voyages to the Southern Whale Fishery. On one of these voyages, in 1812, a French privateer captured Frederick but the British Royal Navy captured the privateer, and recaptured Frederick. She is last listed in 1822.

Slaver
Frederick enters Lloyd's Register in the Supplemental pages in 1805 with M'Donald, master, Thomas Lumley, owner, and trade London-Africa.

Captain James MacDonald received a letter of marque on 3 September 1805. He then sailed Frederick on two slaving voyages. On 16 September 1805 he sailed to the Gold Coast to gather the slaves. On 16 March 1806 Frederick sailed from Africa. While she had been gathering her slaves she was attacked from shore. She delivered her slaves to British Guiana, where she arrived on 16 May. She had embarked 277 slaves and she disembarked 249, for a loss rate of 11.6%.

The next year he sailed to the Bight of Benin, leaving London on 1 January 1807. Frederick gathered her slaves at Lagos/Onim. After Frederick left Lagos she stopped at Príncipe. From there delivered the slaves to Kingston, Jamaica, where she arrived on 29 July. She had embarked 269 slaves and she disembarked 242, for a loss rate of 10%. She left Kingston on 18 November, and arrived back at  London on 4 February 1808.

Then in late 1809, Lumley sold her to W. Wilson. Her trade changed from London-Curacoa to London-South Seas fisheries, and her master changed from M'Donald to A. Bodie.

Whaler
Daniel and William Bennett then purchased Frederick.

Captain Alexander Bodie received a letter of marque on 28 April 1810. He sailed Frederick from Britain on 26 May. She arrived at Port Jackson on 21 October, with merchandise, having called in at Rio de Janeiro on the way.

Frederick then left Port Jackson 30 November for the "sperm fishery". The fishing grounds were off the Derwent River of Van Diemen's Land.

Frederick, E. Bunker, master, returned to Port Jackson on 20 August 1811 from the fishery, with 55 tons of sperm oil for the London market. She left for the fishery again on 9 October, in ballast and again under Alexander Bodie's command.

Frederick separated from the other three ships on 27 October, off Ascension. They gave chase and Congress captured Argo, but Galatea escaped and arrived at Portsmouth.

However, Frederick next encountered the French 14-gun privateer Sans Souci, J. Rossi (or Rosse), master, from Saint-Malo, which captured her. Some nine days later, on 10 December,  and  captured Sans Souci, which had most of Fredericks crew aboard. On 19 December  recaptured Frederick. San Souci arrived at Plymouth on 20 December. Lloyd's List described her as being of 16 guns and having a crew of 70. It further reported that Adndromache and Briton had chased Sans Souci for 12 hours before catching her. Sans Souci had only captured Frederick after an hour-long engagement in which Frederick lost her mate killed, and had "Body" and three or four other crew severely wounded. The Register of Shipping (1813) had the notation "CAPTURED" by Fredericks name.

Frederick returned to Britain on 22 June 1813 with 450 casks of oil. One record has her captain as "Hammond", and her owner as William and Daniel Bennett. However, Lloyd's Register for both 1813 and 1814 has her master as A. Brodie, changing to J. or Wm. Allen, but her owner as W. Wilson.

From 1815 on both Lloyd's Register and the Register of Shipping have the same entry for Frederick through 1822: J. Allen, master, William & Daniel Bennett, owners, and trade London-South Seas fisheries.

The last detailed report of a whaling voyage has Frederick leaving Britain on 30 September 1816 and returning on 11 November 1817.

Fate
Frederick was broken up in 1821, and is no longer listed after 1822.

Notes, citations, and references
Notes

Citations

References
 
 
Historical Records of New South Wales: Series 1 - Governors' Dispatches to and from England, January, 1809 to June, 1813. (1916). Vol. 7.
Stanbury, Myra, Kandy-Jane Henderson, Bernard Derrien, Nicolas Bigourdan, & Evelyne Le Touze (2015) "Chapter 18: Epilogue" [online]. In: Stanbury, Myra. The Mermaid Atoll Shipwreck: A Mysterious Early 19th-century Loss. (Fremantle, WA: Australian National Centre of Excellence for Maritime Archaeology and the Australasian Institute for Maritime Archaeology): 235-290.   [cited 20 Aug 18].

1805 ships
Captured ships
London slave ships
Whaling ships
Age of Sail merchant ships
Merchant ships of the United Kingdom